Ashaiman Senior High School  is a coeducational second-cycle institution at Ashaiman in the Greater Accra Region of Ghana.

Ashaiman Senior High School was established in September 1990 with thirty (30) students, two teachers and no non-teaching staff. Ashaiman Senior High School is located at Ashaiman, Middle East, Greater Accra, in between the Ashaiman roundabout and the Mandela park.

See also

 Education in Ghana
 List of schools in Ghana

References

Greater Accra Region
High schools in Ghana
Educational institutions established in 1990
1990 establishments in Ghana

Administrator:Mr Elipklim